Sheila Elaine Frazier (born November 13, 1948) is an American actress, producer, and model. Frazier is known for her role as Georgia in the 1972 crime drama film Super Fly. Frazier later reprised her role in the 1973 sequel, Super Fly T.N.T.

Early Life
Sheila Elaine Frazier was born in New York City, New York to Dorothy Dennis and Eugene Cole Frazier. She lived on the Lower East Side of Manhattan and attended PS 97 until age ten, when she moved with her mother to Englewood, New Jersey. There, she enrolled in the Liberty School. As a young girl, Frazier had a stutter, which contributed to her shyness. When she was in sixth grade, a teacher purported to help her overcome stuttering by announcing to the class before Sheila's presentation: “I don’t want any laughter. Sheila’s a stutterer. I don’t want any laughter.” Frazier has said that introduction was so painful it merely intensified her anxiety about speaking in public.

In Englewood, she counted among her neighbors Clyde McPhatter, Van McCoy, The Isley Brothers, and Dolly and Jackie McLean. She went on to Dwight Morrow High School, where her classmates included Margaret Travolta, actress and sister of John Travolta. Despite Frazier's struggle with stuttering, she was inspired by Susan Hayward's performance in the film I'll Cry Tomorrow to pursue a career as an actress. After graduating from high school in 1966, at age 17, she moved to New York City, where she stayed with her godmother and found work as a secretary.

Career
One day on the subway, a man approached Frazier and asked if she'd ever considered modelling. That chance encounter led her to do photo sessions with his boss, Bert Andrews. She began to do runway modeling and print work, but was not comfortable with that sort of attention. At some point, she met actor Richard Roundtree, who suggested she audition for the Negro Ensemble Company. Following his advice about focusing on the part she was playing, Frazier found she had overcome her stuttering. Five months later, she auditioned for the film Super Fly, winning the role of Georgia, the lead actress. She went on to work in many film and television productions, including Three the Hard Way. In 1980, she hosted a community affairs show on KNXT-TV in Los Angeles. She also worked as a story editor at Richard Pryor's Indigo Productions.

Film and television

Personal Life
Frazier has been married twice and has one child. Frazier married evangelist minister John Atchison in early–2008 at Crenshaw Christian Center East in Manhattan, New York. Frazier's son, Derek McKeith is from her previous marriage to Sam McKeith. Frazier currently resides in Los Angeles.

References

External links

1948 births
Actresses from New York City
African-American actresses
American film actresses
American stage actresses
American television actresses
Living people
People from the Bronx
People from Englewood, New Jersey
21st-century African-American people
21st-century African-American women
20th-century African-American people
20th-century African-American women